The 1984 FIBA Europe Under-18 Championship was an international basketball  competition held in Sweden in 1984.

Final ranking

Awards

External links
FIBA Archive

FIBA U18 European Championship
1984–85 in European basketball
1984 in Swedish sport
International youth basketball competitions hosted by Austria